Sjálvstýri (previously Sjálvstýrisflokkurin) (English: referred to interchangeably as Independence, Self-Government, or Home Rule) is a liberal, autonomist political party on the Faroe Islands. It is currently led by the Mayor of Klaksvík, Jógvan Skorheim.

Nýtt Sjálvstýri traditionally supported greater autonomy for the Faroes within the Kingdom of Denmark, but in 1998 it agreed, as part of a coalition deal with Tjóðveldi and Fólkaflokkurin, to support national independence for the Faroes. Today it supports obtaining independence through gradually increasing Faroese autonomy until the Faroe Islands becomes a de facto independent state.

At the 2008 election to the Løgting, the party won 7.2% of the popular vote and 2 out of 33 seats. In early elections in 2011, the party's vote fell to 4.2% and it lost one seat. At the 2011 election to the Løgting, the party won 4% of the votes and got 2 members elected.

Leaders

Election results

Faroese general election

Danish general election

See also
:Category:Self-Government (Faroe Islands) politicians
Liberalism
Contributions to liberal theory
Liberalism worldwide
List of liberal parties
Liberal democracy

References

External links
Sjálvstýrisflokkurin official site

Political parties in the Faroe Islands
Liberal parties in Denmark
Centrist parties in Denmark
Separatism in Denmark
Social liberal parties